William Sharpe  was an Oxford college head.

Sharpe was educated at Westminster School. He was Principal of Hertford College, Oxford, from 1753 to 1757.

References

People educated at Westminster School, London
Principals of Hertford College, Oxford
18th-century English people